Glen Mary is an unincorporated community in Winston County, Alabama, United States.

Geography
Glen Mary is located at  (34.124268, -87.623633). It lies 722 feet (220 m) above sea level.

References

Populated places established in 1908
Unincorporated communities in Alabama
Unincorporated communities in Winston County, Alabama
1908 establishments in Alabama